The 1990–91 season was the 89th season in which Dundee competed at a Scottish national level, playing in the Scottish First Division after being relegated the previous season. Dundee would finish in 3rd place and would miss out on promotion by a single point. Dundee would also compete in both the Scottish League Cup and the Scottish Cup, where they were knocked out by Queen of the South in the 2nd round of the League Cup, and by inter-city rivals Dundee United in the quarter-finals of the Scottish Cup. Dundee would also compete in the inaugural Scottish Challenge Cup, and would win the competition, defeating Ayr United in the final.

Scottish First Division 

Statistics provided by Dee Archive.

League table

Scottish League Cup 

Statistics provided by Dee Archive.

Scottish Cup 

Statistics provided by Dee Archive.

Scottish Challenge Cup 
Statistics provided by Dee Archive.

Player statistics 
Statistics provided by Dee Archive

|}

See also 

 List of Dundee F.C. seasons

References

External links 

 1990–91 Dundee season on Fitbastats

Dundee F.C. seasons
Dundee